For various forms of wars based on mobility, see Maneuver warfare  
For the specific military methods of Mao Zedong, yundong zhan, see Mobile Warfare